Ignacio Amadeo Martín Goenaga (born 15 October 1983) is a Spanish rugby sevens player. He competed at the 2016 Summer Olympics for the Spanish rugby sevens team. He was also part of the team that defeated  to earn the last spot for the Olympics.

Martín played at the 2013 Rugby World Cup Sevens. He is married to Juliet Itoya.

References

External links 
 

1983 births
Living people
Rugby union players from the Basque Country (autonomous community)
Rugby sevens players at the 2016 Summer Olympics
Olympic rugby sevens players of Spain
Spain international rugby sevens players
Sportspeople from San Sebastián